The 2011 Aegon GB Pro-Series Barnstaple was a professional tennis tournament played on hard courts. It was the fourth edition of the tournament which was part of the 2011 ITF Women's Circuit. It took place in Barnstaple, Great Britain between 23 and 29 October 2011.

WTA entrants

Seeds

 1 Rankings are as of October 17, 2011.

Other entrants
The following players received wildcards into the singles main draw:
  Naomi Broady
  Amanda Elliott
  Anna Fitzpatrick
  Tara Moore

The following players received entry from the qualifying draw:
  Marta Domachowska
  Johanna Konta
  Kristína Kučová
  Marta Sirotkina

The following player received entry from a Lucky loser spot:
  Maria João Köhler

Champions

Singles

 Anne Keothavong def.  Marta Domachowska, 6–1, 6–3

Doubles

 Eva Birnerová /  Anne Keothavong def.  Sandra Klemenschits /  Tatjana Malek, 7–5, 6–1

External links
Official Website
ITF Search 

Aegon GB Pro-Series Barnstaple
Aegon GB Pro-Series Barnstaple
2011 in English tennis